William Scott Hardy (born 1971) is a United States district judge of the United States District Court for the Western District of Pennsylvania.

Education 

Hardy earned his Bachelor of Arts, magna cum laude, from Allegheny College and his Juris Doctor from Notre Dame Law School.

Career 

Hardy practiced for more than a decade at Cohen & Grigsby. He previously served as President of the Dean W. Edward Sell Chapter of the American Inns of Court. Before becoming a judge, he was a shareholder in the Pittsburgh office of Ogletree, Deakins, Nash, Smoak & Stewart, where his practice focused on labor and employment matters.

Federal judicial service 

On November 6, 2019, President Donald Trump announced his intent to nominate Hardy to serve as a United States district judge of the United States District Court for the Western District of Pennsylvania. On December 2, 2019, his nomination was sent to the Senate. President Trump nominated Hardy to the seat vacated by Judge Nora Barry Fischer, who assumed senior status on June 13, 2019. Pennsylvania Senators Pat Toomey and Bob Casey Jr. endorsed the nomination. On January 3, 2020, his nomination was returned to the President under Rule XXXI, Paragraph 6 of the United States Senate. On January 6, 2020, his renomination was sent to the Senate. A hearing on his nomination before the Senate Judiciary Committee was held on January 8, 2020. On May 14, 2020, his nomination was reported out of committee by a 14–8 vote. On July 23, 2020, the United States Senate invoked cloture on his nomination by a 60–32 vote. On July 27, 2020, his nomination was confirmed by a 65–30 vote. He received his judicial commission on July 31, 2020.

References

External links 
 

1971 births
Living people
20th-century American lawyers
21st-century American lawyers
21st-century American judges
Allegheny College alumni
Judges of the United States District Court for the Western District of Pennsylvania
Lawyers from Pittsburgh
Notre Dame Law School alumni
Pennsylvania lawyers
Pennsylvania Republicans
United States district court judges appointed by Donald Trump
West Virginia lawyers